Malin Sofi Moström (born 1 August 1975) is a Swedish former football midfielder, from 2001 to 2006 she was the captain of the Sweden women's national football team. Nicknamed "Mosan", she retired in December 2006 in order to focus on her family and new career as a property agent.

Club career
Starting her career in Hägglunds IoFK in her native Örnsköldsvik, she joined Umeå IK in 1995, playing in Damallsvenskan, the highest division of women's football in Sweden. In 2000 she won her first Swedish Championship with the club, and in the following year received the Diamantbollen, the Swedish Football Association's annual prize to the woman player of the year. She also won the Midfielder of the Year in 2003–2005. In 2002 she became the captain of Umeå IK, and in 2003 and 2004, she won the UEFA Women's Cup with the team.

When Moström retired after the 2006 season, Umeå IK retired the number six shirt in her honour. The following season she made a brief comeback, to cover for injuries to Johanna Frisk and Hanna Ljungberg.

In April 2019, she was recognised with the inaugural 'One Club Woman' award by Spanish club Athletic Bilbao for her achievements and loyalty to Umeå.

International career
On 26 July 1998 Moström made her senior debut for Sweden in a friendly against England at Victoria Road, Dagenham. Entering the game as a substitute, she spoiled Hope Powell's first match as England manager by scoring the only goal on 84 minutes.

As a national team player, she has played more than 110 national fixtures, and was one of the most important players when the national team won the silver medal at the FIFA Women's World Cup 2003. Moström's 79th minute goal against Canada in the Semi-Final of that tournament tied the match and kept Swedish hopes alive. In the 2004 Olympic football tournament she scored a match-winning goal against Nigeria in the final round of the group stage, which took Sweden to the quarter final.

Matches and goals scored at World Cup & Olympic tournaments

Matches and goals scored at European Championship tournaments
Malin Moström appeared at two European Championship tournaments: Germany 2001, and England 2005.

Honours

Club
Umeå IK
Damallsvenskan: Winner 2000, 2001, 2002, 2005, 2006, 2007
Svenska Cupen: Winner 2001, 2002, 2003, 2007
Svenska Supercupen: Winner 2007
UEFA Women's Champions League: Winner 2003, 2004, Runner-up 2002

Country

Sweden
1999 FIFA Women's World Cup: Quarter-final
2003 FIFA Women's World Cup: Runner-up
2000 Summer Olympics in Sydney: Group stage
2004 Summer Olympics in Athens: Fourth place
UEFA Women's Euro 2001: Runner-up
UEFA Women's Euro 2005: Semi-finals
Algarve Cup (Participated from 1999 to 2006): Winner 2001
Australia Cup: Winners 2003

Individual

Best Swedish Midfielder: 2003, 2004, 2005
Diamantbollen: 2001
FIFA Women's World Cup All-Star Team: 2003
One Club Woman Award: 2019

Personal life
In April 2008 Moström and her husband, former professional ice hockey player Jesper Jäger, moved to Switzerland with their infant daughter Svea. Jäger had secured a coaching role with HC Lugano.

References

Match reports

External links
 
 SvFF Profile

1975 births
Living people
People from Örnsköldsvik Municipality
Swedish women's footballers
Olympic footballers of Sweden
Footballers at the 2000 Summer Olympics
Footballers at the 2004 Summer Olympics
Umeå University alumni
Sweden women's international footballers
FIFA Century Club
Umeå IK players
Damallsvenskan players
Women's association football midfielders
2003 FIFA Women's World Cup players
1999 FIFA Women's World Cup players
Sportspeople from Västernorrland County